Idesheim is a municipality in the district of Bitburg-Prüm, in Rhineland-Palatinate, western Germany.

Localities 

 Ittel

References

Bitburg-Prüm